Paradiarsia is a genus of moths of the family Noctuidae.

Species
 Paradiarsia coturnicola Graeser, 1892
 Paradiarsia littoralis (Packard, 1867)
 Paradiarsia punicea (Hübner, [1803])

References
Natural History Museum Lepidoptera genus database
Paradiarsia at funet

Noctuinae